Marin and Tomislav Draganja were the defending champions but chose not to defend their title.

Tobias Kamke and Tim Pütz won the title after defeating Sanchai and Sonchat Ratiwatana 3–6, 7–5, [12–10] in the final.

Seeds

Draw

References
 Main Draw
 Qualifying Draw

Keio Challenger - Men's Doubles
2018 Men's Doubles
2018 Keio Challenger